Kermia aniani is a species of sea snail, a marine gastropod mollusk in the family Raphitomidae.

Description
The length of the shell attains 3.1 mm, its diameter 1.2 mm.

Distribution
This marine species occurs off Hawaii and Tahiti.

References

 Kay, E.A. 1979. Hawaiian marine shells. Reef and shore fauna of Hawaii. Section 4: Mollusca. Bernice P. Bishop Museum Special Publications 64 (4): 1–653.

External links
 Gastropods.com: Kermia aniani
 
  Kay, E. A. (1979). Hawaiian marine shells. Reef and shore fauna of Hawaii. Section 4: Mollusca. Bernice P. Bishop Museum Special Publications. 64xviii + 1-653
 Moretzsohn, Fabio, and E. Alison Kay. "HAWAIIAN MARINE MOLLUSCS." (1995)

aniani
Gastropods described in 1979